The Soling was an event on the 2008 Vintage Yachting Games program at the IJsselmeer, Netherlands. Six out of the seven scheduled race were completed. 36 sailors, on 12 boats, from 10 nations entered.

Venue overview

Race area and Course
Approximately 2 nautical miles of the coast of Medemblik two course areas (orange and yellow) were used for the 2008 edition of the Vintage Yachting Games.

For the 2008 edition of the Vintage Yachting Games, four different courses were available. The Soling could use course 4 and course 3 (above windspeeds of 14kn).

Wind conditions 
During the 2008 Vintage Yachting Games, the sailors experienced the following weather conditions:

Races

Summary 
In the Soling at race area Yellow, only six races could be completed.

Although the early start of the second race the consistent performance of the team of Rudy den Outer, Leo Determan and Ronald den Arend made sure they won the series. The team of former Soling World champion Steven Bakker with Sven/Dick Coster and Joost Houweling took the silver before the German team of Holger Weichert, Laurent Scheel, and Martin Setzkorn.

Results 

 Crossed out results did not count for the total result.

Daily standings

Victors

References 

 

Soling